Jeevanadi is a 1970 Indian Tamil-language musical film directed by A. K. Subramanian. The film stars Ravichandran and Lakshmi. It was released on 14 January 1970.

Plot

Cast 
 Ravichandran
 Lakshmi

Soundtrack 
The soundtrack was composed by V. Dakshinamoorthy. The song "Aruvi Magal" is set in the carnatic raga known as Saranga. S. Shivpprasadh of The Hindu wrote that Jeevanadi was one of Dakshinamoorthy's films that "had melody as their strength."

References

Bibliography

External links 
 

1970s musical films
1970s Tamil-language films
Films with screenplays by K. S. Gopalakrishnan
Indian musical films